Philip Baldi (born 1946) is an American linguist and classical scholar specializing in Indo-European studies. He is Professor Emeritus of Linguistics and Classics at Pennsylvania State University.

Biography
Baldi was born in Scranton, Pennsylvania in 1946. He received his B.A. from the University of Scranton in Classics in 1968, his M.A. and Ph.D. in Linguistics from the University of Rochester in 1971 and 1973, respectively. He was appointed Professor of Linguistics and Classics at Pennsylvania State University in 1981. Baldi specializes in Indo-European studies, on which he is the author of numerous books and articles.

Works

 (Condensed version of above, primarily for classroom use)

References

External links

Philip Baldi at WorldCat
 Philip Baldi at LinkedIn
 Philip Baldi at the website of Pennsylvania State University

American classical scholars
Linguists from the United States
Indo-Europeanists
University of Scranton alumni
University of Rochester alumni
Pennsylvania State University faculty
Living people
1946 births